Instinto (Instinct) is the third album by Colombian singer-songwriter Maía, released by Sony Music on April 25, 2012.

Track listing

Awards
On September 25, 2012 the album received a Latin Grammy Award nomination as Best Contemporary Tropical Album.

|-
|rowspan="1" style="text-align:center;"|2012||rowspan="1"|Instinto
|Latin Grammy Award for Best Contemporary Tropical Album|| 
|-

References

2012 albums
Maía (singer) albums
Sony Music Colombia albums
Spanish-language albums